Bernard Joseph Fritsch (17 February 1881 – 22 October 1951) was an Australian rules footballer who played for the South Melbourne Football Club in the Victorian Football League (VFL).

Notes

External links 

1881 births
1951 deaths
Australian rules footballers from Victoria (Australia)
Sydney Swans players